Filipino is a language under the Austronesian language family. It is the national language ( / ) of the Philippines, and one of the two official languages of the country, with English. It is a standardized variety of Tagalog based on the native dialect, spoken and written, in Metro Manila, the National Capital Region, and in other urban centers of the archipelago. The 1987 Constitution mandates that Filipino be further enriched and developed by the other languages of the Philippines. Filipino is only used as a tertiary language in the Philippine public sphere.

Filipino, like other Austronesian languages, commonly uses verb-subject-object order, but can also use subject-verb-object order as well. Filipino follows the trigger system of morphosyntactic alignment that is also common among Austronesian languages. It has head-initial directionality. It is an agglutinative language but can also display inflection. It is not a tonal language and can be considered a pitch-accent language and a syllable-timed language. It has nine basic parts of speech.

Background
The Philippines is a multilingual state with 184 living languages originating and spoken by various ethno-linguistic groups. Many of these languages descend from a common Malayo-Polynesian language due to the Austronesian migration from Taiwan; however, there are languages brought by the indigenous people of the Philippines. The common Malayo-Polynesian language split into different languages and these languages borrowed words from other languages such as Hokkien, Sanskrit, Tamil, and Arabic. There was no single common language across every cultural group in the Philippine archipelago when the Spanish arrived in the 16th century, although chroniclers of the time noted that the kings or chiefs of small polities normally spoke five languages.

A Spanish exploratory mission under Ferdinand Magellan arrived in the Philippines in 1521, and Spanish colonization of the islands followed. The eventual capital established by Spain in the Philippines was Manila, situated in a Tagalog-speaking region, after the conquest of Manila from both the Muslim communities of Rajah Sulayman and Rajah Matanda and the Hindu-Buddhist Kingdom of Tondo ruled by Lakan Dula. Manila was made capital of the new colony both because of fears of raids from the Portuguese and the Dutch, and because of its strategic location. A latter book of the same name was written by Czech Jesuit missionary Paul Klein (known locally as Pablo Clain) at the beginning of the 18th century. Klein spoke Tagalog and used it actively in several of his books. He wrote a dictionary, which he later passed to Francisco Jansens and José Hernández.

Spanish served in an official capacity as language of the government during the Spanish colonial period. During the American colonial period, English became an additional official language of the Philippines alongside Spanish; however, the number of speakers of Spanish steadily decreased.

Designation as the national language
While Spanish and English were considered "official languages" during the American colonial period, there existed no "national language" initially. Article XIII, section 3 of the 1935 constitution establishing the Commonwealth of the Philippines provided that:

On November 13, 1936, the first National Assembly of the Philippine Commonwealth approved Commonwealth Act No. 184; creating the Institute of National Language (later the Surián ng Wikang Pambansâ or SWP) and tasking it with making a study and survey of each existing native language, hoping to choose which was to be the base for a standardized national language. Later, President Manuel L. Quezon later appointed representatives for each major regional language to form the NLI. Led by Jaime C. De Veyra, who sat as the chair of the Institute and as the representative of Samar-Leyte-Visayans, the Institute's members were composed of Santiago A. Fonacier (representing the Ilokano-speaking regions), Filemon Sotto (the Cebu-Visayans), Casimiro Perfecto (the Bikolanos), Felix S. Sales Rodriguez (the Panay-Visayans), Hadji Butu (the languages of Muslim Filipinos), and Cecilio Lopez (the Tagalogs).

The Institute of National Language adopted a resolution on November 9, 1937 recommending Tagalog to be basis of the national language. On December 30, President Quezon issued Executive Order No. 134, s. 1937, approving the adoption of Tagalog as the language of the Philippines, and proclaimed the national language of the Philippines so based on the Tagalog language. Quezon himself was  born & raised in Baler, Aurora, which is a native Tagalog-speaking area. The order stated that it would take effect two years from its promulgation. On December 31 of the same year, Quezon proclaimed Tagalog as the basis of the Wikang Pambansâ (National Language) giving the following factors:
Tagalog is widely spoken and is the most understood language in all the Philippine Regions.
It is not divided into smaller daughter languages, as Visayan or Bikol are.
Its literary tradition is the richest of all native Philippine languages, the most developed and extensive (mirroring that of the Tuscan language vis-à-vis Italian). More books are written in Tagalog than in any other autochthonous Philippine language but Spanish, but this is mainly by virtue of law.
Tagalog has always been the language of Manila, the political and economic center of the Philippines during the Spanish and American eras.
Spanish was the language of the 1896 Revolution and the Katipunan, but the revolution was led by people who also spoke Tagalog.

On June 7, 1940, the Philippine National Assembly passed Commonwealth Act No. 570 declaring that the Filipino national language would be considered an official language effective July 4, 1946 (coinciding with the country's expected date of independence from the United States). That same year, the Balarílà ng Wikang Pambansâ of grammarian Lope K. Santos introduced the 20-letter Abakada alphabet which became the standard of the national language. The alphabet was officially adopted by the Institute for the Tagalog-Based National Language.

Further history 
In 1959, the language became known as Pilipino in an effort to disassociate it from the Tagalog ethnic group. The changing of the name did not, however, result in universal acceptance among non-Tagalogs, especially Cebuanos who had previously not accepted the 1937 selection.

The 1960s saw the rise of the purist movement where new words were being coined to replace loanwords. This era of "purism" by the SWP sparked criticisms by a number of persons. Two counter-movements emerged during this period of "purism": one campaigning against Tagalog and the other campaigning for more inclusiveness in the national language. In 1963, Negros Occidental congressman Innocencio V. Ferrer took a case reaching the Supreme Court questioning the constitutionality of the choice of Tagalog as the basis of the national language (a case ruled in favor of the national language in 1970). Accusing the national language as simply being Tagalog and lacking any substantial input from other Philippine languages, Congressman Geruncio Lacuesta eventually led a "Modernizing the Language Approach Movement" (MOLAM). Lacuesta hosted a number of "anti-purist" conferences and promoted a “Manila Lingua Franca” which would be more inclusive of loanwords of both foreign and local languages. Lacuesta managed to get nine congressmen to propose a bill aiming to abolish the SWP with an Akademia ng Wikang Filipino, to replace the balarila with a Gramatica ng Wikang Filipino, to replace the 20-letter Abakada with a 32-letter alphabet, and to prohibit the creation of neologisms and the respelling of loanwords. This movement quietened down following the death of Lacuesta.

The national language issue was revived once more during the 1971 Constitutional Convention. While there was a sizable number of delegates in favor of retaining the Tagalog-based national language, majority of the delegates who were non-Tagalogs were even in favor of scrapping the idea of a "national language" altogether. A compromise was reached and the wording on the 1973 constitution made no mention of dropping the national language Pilipino or made any mention of Tagalog. Instead, the 1973 Constitution, in both its original form and as amended in 1976, designated English and Pilipino as official languages and provided for development and formal adoption of a common national language, termed Filipino, to replace Pilipino. Neither the original nor the amended version specified either Tagalog or Pilipino as the basis for Filipino; Instead, tasking the National Assembly to:

In 1987, a new constitution designated Filipino as the national language and, along with English, as an official language. That constitution included several provisions related to the Filipino language.

Article XIV, Section 6, omits any mention of Tagalog as the basis for Filipino, and states that:

And also states in the article:

and:

Section 17(d) of Executive Order 117 of January 30, 1987 renamed the Institute of National Language as Institute of Philippine Languages.  Republic Act No. 7104, approved on August 14, 1991, created the Komisyon sa Wikang Filipino (Commission on the Filipino Language, or KWF), superseding the Institute of Philippine Languages. The KWF reports directly to the President and was tasked to undertake, coordinate and promote researches for the development, propagation and preservation of Filipino and other Philippine languages. On May 13, 1992, the commission issued Resolution 92-1, specifying that Filipino is the

However, as with the 1973 and 1987 Constitutions, 92-1 went neither so far as to categorically identify, nor so far as to dis-identify this language as Tagalog. Definite, absolute, and unambiguous interpretation of 92–1 is the prerogative of the Supreme Court in the absence of directives from the KWF, otherwise the sole legal arbiter of the Filipino language.

Filipino was presented and registered with the International Organization for Standardization (ISO), by Ateneo de Manila University student Martin Gomez, and was added to the ISO registry of languages on September 21, 2004, with it receiving the ISO 639-2 code fil.

On August 22, 2007, it was reported that three Malolos City regional trial courts in Bulacan decided to use Filipino, instead of English, in order to promote the national language. Twelve stenographers from Branches 6, 80 and 81, as model courts, had undergone training at Marcelo H. del Pilar College of Law of Bulacan State University following a directive from the Supreme Court of the Philippines. De la Rama said it was the dream of Chief Justice Reynato Puno to implement the program in other such as Laguna, Cavite, Quezon, Aurora, Nueva Ecija, Batangas, Rizal, and Metro Manila, all of which mentioned are native Tagalog-speaking.

Commemoration
Since 1997, a month-long celebration of the national language occurs during August, known in Filipino as Buwan ng Wika (Language Month). Previously, this lasted only a week and was known as Linggo ng Wika (Language Week). The celebration coincides with the month of birth of President Manuel L. Quezon, regarded as the "Ama ng Wikang Pambansa" (Father of the national language).

In 1946, Proclamation No. 35 of March 26 provided for a week-long celebration of the national language. this celebration would last from March 27 until April 2 each year, the last day coinciding with birthday of the Filipino writer Francisco Baltazar, author of the Tagalog epic Florante at Laura.

In 1954, Proclamation No. 12 of March 26 provided that the week of celebration would be from March 29 to April 4 every year. This proclamation was amended the following year by President Ramon Magsaysay by Proclamation No. 186 of September 23, moving the dates of celebration to August 13–19, every year. Now coinciding with the birthday of President Manuel L. Quezon. The reason for the move being given that the original celebration was a period "outside of the school year, thereby precluding the participation of schools in its celebration".

In 1988, President Corazon Aquino signed Proclamation No. 19, reaffirming the celebration every August 13 to 19. In 1997, the celebration was extended from a week to a month by  Proclamation 1041 of July 15 signed by President Fidel V. Ramos.

Comparison of Filipino and Tagalog 
While the official view (shared by the government, the Komisyon ng Wikang Filipino, and a number of educators) is that Filipino and Tagalog are considered separate languages, in practical terms, Filipino may be considered the official name of Tagalog, or even a synonym of it. Today's Filipino language is best described as "Tagalog-based". The language is usually called Tagalog within the Philippines and among Filipinos to differentiate it from other Philippine languages, but it has also come to be known as Filipino to differentiate it from the languages of other countries; the former implies a regional origin, the latter national. This is similar to the comparison between Castilian and Spanish, or Mandarin and Chinese.

Political designations aside, Tagalog and Filipino are linguistically the same; sharing, among other things, the same grammatical structure. On May 23, 2007, Ricardo Maria Nolasco, KWF chair and a linguistics expert, acknowledged in a keynote speech during the NAKEM Conference at the Mariano Marcos State University in Batac, Ilocos Norte, that Filipino was simply Tagalog in syntax and grammar, with as yet no grammatical element or lexicon coming from Ilokano, Cebuano, Hiligaynon, or any of the other Philippine languages. He said further that this is contrary to the intention of Republic Act No. 7104, which requires that the national language be developed and enriched by the lexicon of the country's other languages, something toward which the commission was working. On August 24, 2007, Nolasco elaborated further on the relationship between Tagalog and Filipino in a separate article, as follows:

In connection with the use of Filipino, or specifically the promotion of the national language, the related term Tagalista is frequently used. While the word Tagalista literally means "one who specializes in Tagalog language or culture" or a "Tagalog specialist", in the context of the debates on the national language and "Imperial Manila", the word Tagalista is used as a reference to "people who promote or would promote the primacy of Tagalog at the expense of [the] other [Philippine] indigenous tongues".

Example

This is a translation of Article 1 of the Universal Declaration of Human Rights. Usually, the diacritics are not written and the syntax and grammar is based from Tagalog.

See also

 Philippine literature
 Philippine Braille
 Filipino Sign Language
 Filipino orthography
 Filipino alphabet
 Abakada alphabet
 Suyat
 Tagalog grammar
 Tagalog language
 Tagalog phonology
 Tagalog Wikipedia
 Taglish
 List of loanwords in Tagalog
 Commission on the Filipino Language
 UP Diksiyonaryong Filipino

Notes

References

Citations

Sources

Additional sources

New Vicassan's English–Pilipino Dictionary by Vito C. Santos, 
Learn Filipino: Book One by Victor Eclar Romero 
Lonely Planet Filipino/Tagalog (Travel Talk) 
Lonely Planet Pilipino Phrasebook 
UP Diksyonaryong Filipino by Virgilio S. Almario (ed.) , and 
English–Pilipino Dictionary, Consuelo T. Panganiban,  
Diksyunaryong Filipino–English, Komisyon sa Wikang Filipino, 
New English–Filipino Filipino–English Dictionary, by Maria Odulio de Guzman 
[ "When I was a child I spoke as a child": Reflecting on the Limits of a Nationalist Language Policy] by Danilo Manarpaac. In:  [ The politics of English as a world language: new horizons in postcolonial cultural studies] by Christian Mair. Rodopi; 2003 . p. 479–492.

Further reading

Commission on the Filipino Language 
Language planning in multilingual countries: The case of the Philippines, discussion by linguist and educator Andrew Gonzalez
 "...a third of the Filipino language is derived from Spanish words, constituting some 4,000 'loan words'".

 
  Published online: April 18, 2012

 
Standard languages
Tagalog dialects
National symbols of the Philippines